Claudia Eisinger (born 22 September 1984) is a German actress. She appeared in more than thirty films since 2006.

Selected filmography

References

External links

1984 births
Living people
German film actresses